Monchy is a town and second-order administrative division of Gros Islet District in the island nation of Saint Lucia.

Notable people
Vladimir Lucien, writer, critic and actor

Nearby sites of interest
The following sites of interest are near Monchy:
Comerette Point, 
Mount de Feu, 
Mount Galac, 242 m elevation
Mount des Bottes, 242 m elevation
Mount Reddie, 288 m elevation
Mount Layau, 139 m elevation
Pointe Pelée, 
Rouge Point, 
La Borne,  (town)
Cletus Village,  (town)
Dauphin,  (town)
La Feuillet,  (town)
Vieux Sucreic,  (town)
Caribbean Jewel Beach Resort, 
Sunset Hill Resort and Spa,

References

Towns in Saint Lucia